DBF may refer to:

.dbf, a file format introduced by dBASE database system, since adopted by other applications as well (database file)
dBf, decibels above a femtowatt, a unit used to measure power and gain
Distributed Bellman-Ford, a Distance-vector routing protocol
Danmarks Badminton Forbund (Denmark's Badminton Union)
Diesel Boats Forever (Diesel Boats Forever)
Design/Build/Fly aircraft design competition
Oracle tablespace filename extension
Digital beamforming in radar, sonar, audio, and other sensor arrays 
Direct breastfeeding
Distributed feedback laser – a type of a laser
Drunk Bitch Friday – formerly a weekly bit on the Lex and Terry morning radio show.

See also